Karin Smirnov or Smirnoff (née Strindberg; 26 February 1880 – 10 May 1973) was a Finno-Swedish writer. She was the daughter of August Strindberg and Siri von Essen.

Smirnov was a socialist; she married Russian Bolshevik . She wrote plays and also books about her mother and father, and their marriage.

Finnish writers in Swedish
Swedish-speaking Finns
1880 births
1973 deaths
Strindberg family